The Basketball tournament at the 2007 All-Africa Games was held in Algeria from 12 July to 22 July. The winners were Angola who defeated Egypt in the finals 56-50. 

Group A played in Harcha. Group B played in Staoueli. The quarter-finals were held on 19 July, the semi-finals on 20 July and the final on 22 July. Senegal was drawn into Group A but withdrew before the start of the tournament.

Competition format
The teams with the four best records qualified for the knockout stage, which was a single-elimination tournament. The semifinal winners contested for the gold medal, while the losers played for the bronze medal.

Calendar

Men's competition

Women's competition

Medal summary

Medal table

Events

Final standings

External links
 Tough Draw For Liberia liberiansoccer.com, Julu M. Johnson, 22 April 2007
 All-Africa Games Men  africabasket.com

References

 
2007
2007 All-Africa Games
2007 in African basketball
International basketball competitions hosted by Algeria